Real estate business is the profession of buying, selling, or renting real estate (land, buildings, or housing).

Sales and marketing
It is common practice for an intermediary to provide real estate owners with dedicated sales and marketing support in exchange for commission. In North America, this intermediary is referred to as a real estate agent, real estate broker or realtor, whilst in the United Kingdom, the intermediary would be referred to as an estate agent. In Australia the intermediary is referred to as a real estate agent or real estate representative or the agent.

There have been various studies to detect the determinants of housing prices to this day, mostly trying to examine the impacts of structural, locational and environmental attributes of houses.

Transactions

A real estate transaction is the process whereby rights in a unit of property (or designated real estate) is transferred between two or more parties, e.g. in case of conveyance one party being the seller(s) and the other being the buyer(s). It can often be quite complicated due to the complexity of the property rights being transferred, the amount of money being exchanged, and government regulations. Conventions and requirements also vary considerably among different countries of the world and among smaller legal entities (jurisdictions).

In more abstract terms, a real estate transaction, like other financial transactions, causes transaction costs. To identify and possibly reduce these transaction costs, the Organisation for Economic Co-operation and Development (OECD) addressed the issue through a study commissioned by the European Commission,
 and through a research action.

The mentioned research action ‘Modelling Real Property Transactions’ investigated methods to describe selected transactions in a formal way, to allow for comparisons across countries / jurisdictions. Descriptions were performed both using a more simple format, a Basic Use Case template, and more advanced applications of the Unified Modelling Language. Process models were compared through an ontology-based methodology, and national property transaction costs were estimated for Finland and Denmark, based on the directions of the United Nations System of National Accounts.

Real estate transactions: subdivision, conveyance, and mortgaging, as they are performed in the five Nordic countries are described in some detail. A translation into English is available for the Danish part.

See also

 Buyer brokerage (in the United States)
 Buying agent (in the United Kingdom)
 Double closing
 FIRE economy
 Graduate real estate education
 Index of real estate articles
 Internal Revenue Code section 1031
 International real estate
 Investment rating for real estate
 Mortgage loan
 Net lease
 NNN lease
 Private equity real estate
 Estate agent (in the United Kingdom)
 Real estate agent (in the United States)
 Real estate bubble
 Real estate appraisal
 Real estate development
 Real estate economics
 Real estate in China
 Real estate investment trust
 Real estate owned
 Real estate transaction
 Real estate transfer tax
 Real estate trends
 Real property
 Rural land sales
 Specialized investment fund
 Subprime mortgage crisis

References

External links